Universitatea Cluj-Napoca, commonly known as  Universitatea Cluj, or simply as U Cluj, is a team handball club from Cluj-Napoca, Romania, that plays in the Divizia A. The club is a historical one in Romania, but in recent years the team is stuck in the second league, in principle due to the low budget.

Kits

Sports Hall information

Name: – Sala Sporturilor "Horia Demian"
City: – Cluj-Napoca
Capacity: – 2525
Address: – Strada Splaiul Independenţei 6, Cluj-Napoca 400000, Romania

Honours
Liga Națională:
Third  (3): 1969, 1970, 2000

Divizia A:
Third  (1): 2018

References

External links
 
 

Romanian handball clubs
Sport in Cluj County
Sport in Cluj-Napoca
Handball clubs established in 1935
1935 establishments in Romania
Liga Națională (men's handball)
Divizia A (men's handball)